Delias salvini is a butterfly in the family Pieridae. It was described by Arthur Gardiner Butler in 1882. It is endemic to New Britain (Australasian realm). The name honours Osbert Salvin.

References

External links
Delias at Markku Savela's Lepidoptera and Some Other Life Forms

salvini
Butterflies described in 1882